The Voice of Switzerland is a Swiss reality talent show created by John de Mol and based on the concept The Voice of Holland. It is part of an international series. It began airing on SRF 1 on January 26, 2013 and ended after two seasons, on April 19, 2014. After 6 years the show returned, on January 27, 2020 on 3+.

Format
About 110 participants are invited for the first phase of the television program, the so-called "blind auditions". There, the candidates, accompanied by a live band, have to sing in front of an audience on a stage. At first, the jury members can only hear but not see the singer because they are sitting in a swivel chair with their backs to the stage. You can vote for a candidate by turning to them during the audition lecture to see them. The candidate will go one round if they receive at least one of the four jury votes. Among those jury members who have turned for them, the candidate chooses their coach for the further rounds. In the blind auditions each of the four coaches should get a group of ten candidates.

This is followed by a training session in which the coaches prepare their candidates for the second phase called "Battle Round". In the Battle Round, two candidates from the same coaching group sing one song in a duet. Only one of the two candidates will continue after the decision of the respective coach. Since the second season (2014), a candidate who has not been selected by his own coach can be taken on by one of the other coaches. After the battles each coach selects three artists for the live shows in a phase called "Sing-off" (2013) or "Knockout Round" (2014).

In the last phase, the live shows, the candidates compete against each other within their coaching groups and are judged by both the coaches and the television viewers. Representatives of different coaches meet each other in the final of the best four participants. In the final only the television viewers decide on the victory.

Coaches and presenters

Coaches

Presenters

 Key
 Main presenter
 Backstage presenter

Coaches and finalists 

 – Winning coach and contestant
 – Runner-up coach and contestant
 – Third place coach and contestant
 – Fourth place coach and contestant

Winners are in bold, the finalists are in italicized font, and the eliminated artists are in small font.

Season summary 

Warning: the following table presents a significant amount of different colors.

References

Swiss reality television series
Swiss
Schweizer Radio und Fernsehen original programming